Luis Miguel Gallardo Fuentes (born 27 June 1986 in Paso Canoas, Chiriquí) is a Panamanian footballer.

Club career
Born in a Panama-Costa Rica border town, Gallardo played in Costa Rica for Pérez Zeledón from 2001 before joining Major League Soccer team Columbus Crew in April 2005, only to return to Pérez Zeledón after an unsuccessful spell. In February 2008 he made his debut for Uruguayan side Tacuarembó, but he returned to Costa Rica once again to play for UCR in summer 2008. A year later he moved across the border again after being snapped up by Atlético Chiriquí.

In January 2010 he returned to Costa Rica to play for Herediano in the Costa Rican Primera División, only to be released in April 2010.

International career
Gallardo represented Panama at the 2005 FIFA World Youth Championship in the Netherlands.

Gallardo has made four appearances for the senior Panama national football team. His debut was a 2006 FIFA World Cup qualifying match against the United States on 12 October 2005 and his final game was a May 2007 friendly match against Colombia.

Personal life
Born to Maria Erenia Fuentes and Jorge Gallardo, he has a sister named Georgina Vanessa Gallardo.

References

External links
 
 Profile at TenfieldDigital.com.uy 
 MLSnet.com profile

1986 births
Living people
People from Barú District, Chiriquí
Association football midfielders
Panamanian footballers
Panama international footballers
Municipal Pérez Zeledón footballers
Columbus Crew players
Tacuarembó F.C. players
C.F. Universidad de Costa Rica footballers
Atlético Chiriquí players
C.S. Herediano footballers
Atlético Veragüense players
Panamanian expatriate footballers
Expatriate footballers in Costa Rica
Expatriate soccer players in the United States
Expatriate footballers in Uruguay